This is a list of songs recorded by Yoko Ono, sorted alphabetically and listing the year of each song's first official release and the album(s) and/or single(s) they were included on.

Songs

Unreleased Songs

References

Lists of songs recorded by Japanese artists